The Woodland Street Firehouse is an historic fire station at 36 Woodland Street in Worcester, Massachusetts.  It is one of the finest of Worcester Victorian-era firehouses.  The two story brick building was built in 1886 in a Queen Anne style, with some Romanesque details.  It is nearly identical to Worcester's Cambridge Street Firehouse; both were designed by Fuller & Delano and built the same year.

The building was listed on the National Register of Historic Places in 1980.  It is no longer used as a firehouse. Engine 10 ran out of this station until 1979 when it moved to Park Ave until the company was eliminated in 2009.

See also
Woodland Street Historic District
National Register of Historic Places listings in southwestern Worcester, Massachusetts
National Register of Historic Places listings in Worcester County, Massachusetts

References

Fire stations completed in 1886
Towers completed in 1886
Buildings and structures in Worcester, Massachusetts
Queen Anne architecture in Massachusetts
Fire stations on the National Register of Historic Places in Massachusetts
National Register of Historic Places in Worcester, Massachusetts
Defunct fire stations in Massachusetts
1886 establishments in Massachusetts